Utetheisa palla is a moth in the family Erebidae. It was described by Röber in 1891. It is found on Sumbawa and Flores.

References

Moths described in 1891
palla